Leonardo David de Moura (born 17 February 1983), commonly known as Léo Gago, is a Brazilian professional footballer who plays as a defensive midfielder for  Sampaio Corrêa.

Honours

Club
Mineiros
Campeonato Goiano Série B: 2004

Ceará
Campeonato Cearense: 2006

Fortaleza
Campeonato Cearense: 2007

Avaí
Campeonato Catarinense: 2009

Coritiba
Campeonato Brasileiro Série B: 2010
Campeonato Paranaense: 2011

Palmeiras
Campeonato Brasileiro Série B: 2013

References

External links

Léo Gago at Footballzz
Léo Gago profile. O Gol.

1983 births
Living people
Brazilian footballers
Campeonato Brasileiro Série A players
Campeonato Brasileiro Série B players
Mineiros Esporte Clube players
Ceará Sporting Club players
Fortaleza Esporte Clube players
Paraná Clube players
Avaí FC players
CR Vasco da Gama players
Coritiba Foot Ball Club players
Grêmio Foot-Ball Porto Alegrense players
Sociedade Esportiva Palmeiras players
Esporte Clube Bahia players
Clube Atlético Bragantino players
América Futebol Clube (RN) players
Itumbiara Esporte Clube players
Sampaio Corrêa Futebol Clube players
Association football midfielders
Sportspeople from Campinas